"Future World" is a song by the Japanese J-pop group Every Little Thing, released as their second single on October 23, 1996.

Track listing
 Future World — 4:05 (Words & music - Mitsuru Igarashi)
 Season — 4:26 (Words & music - Mitsuru Igarashi)
 Future World (instrumental) — 4:04
 Season (instrumental) — 4:25

Chart positions

External links
 Future World information at Avex Network.
 Future World information at Oricon.
 Future World information at Mora.jp (songs length)

1996 singles
Every Little Thing (band) songs
Songs written by Mitsuru Igarashi
1996 songs
Avex Trax singles